Dommeldange is a quarter in north-eastern Luxembourg City, in southern Luxembourg.

, the quarter has a population of 2,671 inhabitants.

References

Quarters of Luxembourg City